Dover Township is one of the fourteen townships of Union County, Ohio, United States.  The 2010 census found 2,158 people in the township.

Geography
Located in the eastern part of the county, it borders the following townships:
Leesburg Township - north
Scioto Township, Delaware County - east
Millcreek Township - south
Paris Township - west

A small part of the city of Marysville, the county seat of Union County, is located in southwestern Dover Township. The unincorporated area of New Dover, Ohio is also located in the township.

Name and history
Statewide, other Dover Townships are located in Athens, Fulton, and Tuscarawas counties.

The township was organized in 1839.

Government
The township is governed by a three-member board of trustees, who are elected in November of odd-numbered years to a four-year term beginning on the following January 1. Two are elected in the year after the presidential election and one is elected in the year before it. There is also an elected township fiscal officer, who serves a four-year term beginning on April 1 of the year after the election, which is held in November of the year before the presidential election. Vacancies in the fiscal officership or on the board of trustees are filled by the remaining trustees.

References

External links
County website

Townships in Union County, Ohio
Townships in Ohio